Mahmadruzi Iskandarov (born 3 May 1954) is a Tajik opposition politician and the chairman of the Democratic Party of Tajikistan. Arrested in 2005, he is currently serving a 23-year prison term. As Iskandarov is serving his jail sentence, Masud Sobirov has taken leadership of the Democratic Party.

References

Living people
Iskanadarov, Mahmadruzi
Tajikistani prisoners and detainees
Prisoners and detainees of Tajikistan
Year of birth missing (living people)